MotoStudent is a biennial competition between students from universities around the whole world that consist in that these students design, manufacture and develop a prototype of competition motorcycle over a year and a half.

Finally, these prototypes compete in an event at MotorLand Aragón, a circuit situated in Alcañiz, in Aragón, Spain.

Since the beginning of the competition, universities from 20 countries have participated in some edition.

History 

This competition was born in Aragón, Spain, becoming an alternative to Formula SAE. On it, students must, on the one hand, present a viable project for the mass production of a motorcycle that they themselves design (calling this part of the competition as MS1), and on the other, manufacture the designed motorcycle, to later evaluate its performance in a final event alongside the rest of the participants (receiving the name of MS2).

Initially, the only existing category was for prototypes with petrol engine, being a 125 cc and 2-stroke engine from Gas Gas brand. This first edition, in which 23 teams participated, mostly Spanish and Italian, culminated in autumn 2010, with a final event on the MotorLand Aragón track, where the final event of the competition has been held each edition since.

The second edition took place between 2011 and 2012, with lower reception, as the number of registered teams was reduced to 18. In this new edition the regulations were adapted to become similar to the newly created moto3 category, replacing the engine used in the previous edition by a 4-stroke and 250 cc, this time, made by Yamaha.

In the third edition, held between 2013 and 2014, the number of participating teams increased to 33, consolidating this event at an international level. Sherco was the brand of the engines supplied to the participants on this occasion.

In the fourth edition, which took place between 2015 and 2016, a category for 100% electric prototypes was included for the first time. On this occasion, 35 teams are registered in the "petrol" category, powered by an Honda engine, while 17 new teams decide to venture into the newly created "electric" category.

The fifth edition, carried out between the years 2017 and 2018, represents the continuity of the competition in both categories, as it has a high acceptance by increasing to 47 teams registered in the petrol category, and to 27 in the electric. The brand that supplied the gasoline engines on this occasion was KTM.

The sixth edition should have been held between 2019 and 2020, but due to the exceptional situation derived from the COVID-19 pandemic, various postponements took place that lengthened the duration until 2021, with the competition taking place definitively in July of the year. 88 were the teams registered between the two categories, being the historical maximum of participation. To date, it has been the only edition in which an engine model has been repeated in the petrol category, being again supplied by KTM.

List of winners 

The prizes that are distributed in the competition are for the best project (MS1), the best design, the best innovation, the best team adding the points from MS1 plus those from MS2 (global), the best rookie, as well as the three first classified in the MS2 phase, as this is the most relevant as it reflects the behavior of the prototypes in competition.

Podium in the "Petrol" MS2 category

Podium in the "Electric" MS2 category

References 

Student sports competitions
Mechanical engineering competitions
World motorcycle racing series
World University Championships